The Scarlet Pumpernickel is a 1950 Warner Bros. Looney Tunes theatrical cartoon short, directed by Chuck Jones and written by Michael Maltese. The cartoon was released on March 4, 1950, and features Daffy Duck, along with a number of Looney Tunes stars, including the introduction of Melissa Duck. The title is a play on the 1905 novel The Scarlet Pimpernel.

In 1994 it was voted No. 31 of the 50 Greatest Cartoons of all time by members of the animation field.

Plot
In a story within a story, Daffy Duck despairs to Warner Bros.' chief Jack L. Warner – whom he addresses, as most did, as "J.L." – being typecast in comedic roles is "killing me", that he is "dying" to do a dramatic part. He then pitches a script called The Scarlet Pumpernickel, which he wrote under the name "Daffy Dumas Duck". The cartoon then intercuts between scenes in the story and Daffy's pitch, with him announcing the number of the page he is reading from; his script exceeds 1,666 pages.

"Once upon a time in Merry Old England", a young highwayman named the Scarlet Pumpernickel (Daffy) constantly outsmarts the Lord High Chamberlain's (Porky Pig) men, to the Chamberlain's fury and to the delight of the Fair Lady Melissa; he orders her to "Keep away from that masked band-d-d-d-d-desperad-d-d-d-d, that masked stinker!". He then hits upon a scheme to lure Scarlet into town and kill him by marrying Melissa to the Grand Duke (Sylvester), and imprisons her in a tower.

As planned, Scarlet is drawn into town. Disguised as a noble, he visits the Chamberlain, who tells him that Melissa "wishes to see no one until after the wedding". The Grand Duke interrupts, demanding to the Chamberlain that the wedding take place that night, due to rumors that Scarlet is in town and in disguise. The Grand Duke then asks Scarlet who he is. When he replies that he might be the Scarlet Pumpernickel, the Chamberlain and the Grand Duke dissolve into disbelieving fits of laughter. As they take their leave, the Chamberlain agrees to the Grand Duke's request; upon overhearing their plan for the wedding to take place immediately, Scarlet prepares to rescue Melissa.

Crashing the ceremony with the use of "Ye Little Olympic High Jumper" (a pin and a jab in the posterior), Scarlet "rescues" Melissa—who tears herself from the Chamberlain, and runs down the aisle, dragging Scarlet with her while begging him to save her. He takes her to the inn where he is staying, assuring her that she will be safe, then leaves (throughout these scenes is a running gag of Scarlet comparing his bungled "feats" of derring-do to Errol Flynn; i.e. after leaping out of his room's window and hitting the ground, missing his horse's saddle he intended to land in, he tells the audience "That's funny. That never happens to Errol Flynn"). The Grand Duke, in pursuit of Scarlet, stops for respite at the inn, and spots Melissa. As the Grand Duke corners her in her room, Scarlet enters by inadvertently crashing through a wall, missing the window he intended to swing in through.

The Grand Duke and Scarlet then engage in an intense swordfight, but Daffy, not having written the ending, ad-libs an unlikely series of random natural disasters (a thunderstorm breaking a dam, a cavalry charge through the flood, an erupting volcano, and skyrocketing food prices, specifically kreplach), to which a disappointed J.L. asks, "Is that all?" Daffy exclaims in defeat, "There was nothing for the Scarlet Pumpernickel to do, but blow his brains out, which he did." Daffy then pantomimes Scarlet committing suicide with a gun, commenting, "It's getting so you have to kill yourself to sell a story around here".

Reception
Animation historian Greg Ford writes, "It's the 'real-life' Daffy, as seen in the cartoon's wraparound plot of the studio script meeting, that best clues us in to what separates this film from the spate of animated genre parodies currently being churned out. Most modern-day satires trade on anachronism, and the hero and the audience end up complicit in their smug superiority to the antiquated vehicle. But what's funny about The Scarlet Pumpernickel is the tremendous investment its hero puts into his costumed character, and the vast chasm that yawns between Daffy's inflated perception of himself and the highly flawed little black duck that he really is."

Cast
 Mel Blanc as Daffy Duck, Porky Pig, Sylvester, Elmer Fudd, and J.L.
 Marian Richman as Melissa Duck (uncredited)

Production
This Looney Tunes short has an unusually large cast of "star" characters (which, in addition to Daffy, Porky, Sylvester and Melissa (the latter of which makes her debut in this cartoon with her familiar name and look), includes Elmer Fudd, Henery Hawk and Mama Bear from Jones' Three Bears series).

It's notable that, in keeping with the rivalry between Bugs and Daffy that the former is not part of the cast.

Mel Blanc voices Elmer Fudd, who plays the role of an innkeeper here. Elmer was originally voiced by Arthur Q. Bryan, but since the character had only one line of dialogue, Mel Blanc was told to go ahead and imitate Bryan's voice for the character. Blanc did not like imitating, however, believing it to be stealing from another actor.

Home media
The Scarlet Pumpernickel is available, uncensored, digitally restored and uncut on Looney Tunes Golden Collection: Volume 1. It is also available on The Essential Daffy Duck DVD, the Carrotblanca VHS and the Looney Tunes Collectors Edition: Running Amuck VHS from Columbia House. It is also available on DVD and Blu-Ray in the Looney Tunes Platinum Collection: Volume 1.

References

External links

1950 films
1950 animated films
1950 short films
1950s Warner Bros. animated short films
American swashbuckler films
Looney Tunes shorts
Scarlet Pimpernel films
Daffy Duck films
Elmer Fudd films
Porky Pig films
Sylvester the Cat films
Films about Hollywood, Los Angeles
Films about suicide
Animated films set in England
Short films directed by Chuck Jones
Films scored by Carl Stalling
Films with screenplays by Michael Maltese
Warner Bros. Cartoons animated short films
Films about highwaymen
1950s English-language films